A hyperbolic sector is a region of the Cartesian plane bounded by a hyperbola and two rays from the origin to it.

Hyperbolic sectors are the basis for the hyperbolic functions.

Area

The area of a hyperbolic sector in standard position is natural logarithm of  b .

Proof: Integrate under 1/x from 1 to b, add triangle {(0, 0), (1, 0), (1, 1)}, and subtract triangle {(0, 0), (b, 0), (b, 1/b)}.

When in standard position, a hyperbolic sector corresponds to a positive hyperbolic angle at the origin, with the measure of the latter being defined as the area of the former.

Hyperbolic triangle

When in standard position, a hyperbolic sector determines a hyperbolic triangle, the right triangle with one vertex at the origin, base on the diagonal ray y = x, and third vertex on the hyperbola 

with the hypotenuse being the segment from the origin to the point (x, y) on the hyperbola. The length of the base of this triangle is 

and the altitude is 
 
where u is the appropriate hyperbolic angle.

The analogy between circular and hyperbolic functions was described by Augustus De Morgan in his Trigonometry and Double Algebra (1849). William Burnside used such triangles, projecting from a point on the hyperbola xy = 1 onto the main diagonal, in his article "Note on the addition theorem for hyperbolic functions".

Hyperbolic logarithm

It is known that f(x) = xp has an algebraic antiderivative except in the case p = –1 corresponding to the quadrature of the hyperbola. The other cases are given by Cavalieri's quadrature formula. Whereas quadrature of the parabola had been accomplished by Archimedes in the third century BC (in The Quadrature of the Parabola), the hyperbolic quadrature required the invention in 1647 of a new function: Gregoire de Saint-Vincent addressed the problem of computing the areas bounded by a hyperbola. His findings led to the natural logarithm function, once called the hyperbolic logarithm since it is obtained by integrating, or finding the area, under the hyperbola.

Before 1748 and the publication of Introduction to the Analysis of the Infinite, the natural logarithm was known in terms of the area of a hyperbolic sector. Leonhard Euler changed that when he introduced transcendental functions such as 10x. Euler identified e as the value of b producing a unit of area (under the hyperbola or in a hyperbolic sector in standard position). Then the natural logarithm could be recognized as the inverse function to the transcendental function ex.

Hyperbolic geometry

When Felix Klein wrote his book on non-Euclidean geometry in 1928, he provided a foundation for the subject by reference to projective geometry. To establish hyperbolic measure on a line, he noted that the area of a hyperbolic sector provided visual illustration of the concept.

Hyperbolic sectors can also be drawn to the hyperbola . The area of such hyperbolic sectors has been used to define hyperbolic distance in a geometry textbook.

See also 
 Squeeze mapping

References

 Mellen W. Haskell (1895) On the introduction of the notion of hyperbolic functions Bulletin of the American Mathematical Society 1(6):155–9.

Area
Elementary geometry
Integral calculus
Logarithms